The 39th International 500-Mile Sweepstakes was held at the Indianapolis Motor Speedway on Monday, May 30, 1955. The event was part of the 1955 AAA National Championship Trail and was race 3 of 7 in the 1955 World Championship of Drivers.

The race is notable to many as the race in which Bill Vukovich was killed in a crash while seemingly on his way to an unprecedented third consecutive Indy 500 win.

Time trials
Time trials was scheduled for four days.

Saturday May 14 – Pole Day time trials

Gusty winds, as well as the threat of rain, was observed on pole day, therefore nearly all of the competitors stayed off the track. Around the garage area, the drivers and teams agreed amongst themselves to sit out time trials for the afternoon, and instead qualify together in better conditions on Sunday. However, in the final 20 minutes, Jerry Hoyt, who had not been informed about the agreement, suddenly put his car in line, and pulled away for an unexpected qualifying attempt. His speed of 140.045 mph was not spectacular, but as the fastest (and only) car thus far of the day, he sat on the pole position. Without hesitation, Tony Bettenhausen, Sr. took to the track moments later. After two fast laps, he was slowed by a gust of wind, and qualified second. Sam Hanks and Pat O'Connor got their cars ready, but neither were able to complete attempts. The day closed with only two cars in the field, and Hoyt the surprising pole winner – to the dismay of several in the garage area.

Sunday May 15 – Second day time trials

Qualifying resumed in better conditions, and most of the drivers who stayed off the track Saturday took to the track on Sunday. Jack McGrath (142.580 mph) was the fastest qualifier, and lined up third. Hoyt's pole-winning speed from the day before ended up being only the 8th-fastest overall in the field – a record slowest ranked pole speed.

Near the end of the day, Manny Ayulo crashed due to a possible steering fault and died the following day.

Saturday May 21 – Third day time trials
Paul Russo, attempting to qualify the #18 Novi for Troy Ruttman, suffers a broken gearbox.  This was the last appearance of a front-drive car at Indy.

Sunday May 22 – Fourth day time trials

Starting grid 
 = Indianapolis 500 rookie;  = Former Indianapolis 500 winner

Alternates
First alternate: Len Duncan (#24, #73)

Failed to qualify

Manny Ayulo (#88) - Fatal accident
Tony Bonadies  (#36)
Bob Christie  (#7)
Elmer George  (#74)
Gene Hartley (#28)
Bill Homeier (#72, #77)
Johnny Kay  (#76)
Danny Kladis (#93)
Russ Klar  (#61)
Ernie McCoy (#69)
Earl Motter (#81)
Duke Nalon (#31)
Roy Newman  (#93)
Jiggs Peters  (#32)
Paul Russo (#10, #21)
Troy Ruttman (#18)
George Tichenor  (#78)
Johnnie Tolan  - Withdrew, ill
Leroy Warriner  (#64)
Spider Webb (#9)

Race recap
Jack McGrath, starting from the outside despite the fastest qualifying time, grabbed the initial lead, but was quickly challenged by Bill Vukovich, who was looking for his third consecutive win. Vukovich took the lead on lap four, surrendering it back to McGrath on lap 15 but regaining it on lap 16. Fred Agabashian, who had finished in the top ten the previous two years spun on lap 39 and could not continue. McGrath chased Vukovich until lap 54, when he pulled over with mechanical problems. Despite getting out of the car and attempting to repair it himself, he was forced to drop out with a magneto issue. With Vukovich having a considerable lead on lap 56, Rodger Ward, several laps down, flipped over twice, either due to a problem with the wind, oil, or breaking an axle. Although he landed on his wheels, the car was facing the wrong way. Al Keller, attempting to avoid Ward, turned to the inside, going close to or on to the grass, before turning hard to the right and coming quickly back up the track and contacting Johnny Boyd. Boyd's car careened into Vukovich, who appeared to be attempting to also go to the left of Ward. Vukovich made a last second attempt to avoid Boyd to the right, but Boyd's car sent Vukovich hard into the outside barrier. Vukovich's front end also lifted into the air, causing the front to clear the barrier and the car to contact it with the rear, sending the car into a cartwheel, during which it hit several vehicles parked outside the track, and possibly a pole. The car burst into flames after it came to rest, and Vukovich died from injuries from the crash. Boyd's car also flipped but he and the other drivers escaped major injury. Driver Ed Elisian stopped his car on the infield and ran across the track in an attempt to help Vukovich. 

After 27 minutes of running under caution, Jimmy Bryan took over the lead of the race, but was forced to retire after ninety laps with a fuel pump issue, when the lead was taken over by Bob Sweikert. The only other driver to retire due to contact for the remainder of the race was Cal Niday on lap 170. Art Cross led the race from laps 133 to 156, but after surrendering the lead to Don Freeland was forced to retire due to mechanical trouble on lap 168. Freeland similarly was passed by Sweikert on lap 160, and retired on lap 178. Sweikert led the remainder of the race. Sweikert stated that the winds made racing difficult, and perhaps led to a decision of racing cautiously and taking advantage of other's difficulty.

Aftermath 
The two deaths in the 500 were part of a particularly deadly year for motorsports, which also included four other Indy drivers dying in other races, Alberto Ascari being killed while testing a sports car at Monza, and a horrific accident at the 24 Hours of Le Mans which saw nearly 100 fatalities including Pierre Levegh who was driving at the time of the accident. Following the year the American Automobile Association ceased sanctioning auto races (including the Indy 500) and the United States Auto Club (USAC) was formed to handle sanctioning duties. It would take until 1959 for fire suits to be made mandatory for all drivers and roll bars for all cars after Jerry Unser's fatal accident at the 1959 Indianapolis 500.

Box score 

Notes
 – Points towards the 1955 World Drivers' Championship
 – 1 point for fastest lead lap

Additional stats 
 Pole position: Jerry Hoyt – 1:04.27 (while Hoyt started on the pole, Jack McGrath set the fastest time but started on the outside of the first row)
 Fastest Lead Lap: Bill Vukovich – 1:03.67
 Shared Drives:
 Car #10: Tony Bettenhausen (123 laps) and Paul Russo (77 laps). They shared the 6 points for second place.
 Car #77: Walt Faulkner (176 laps) and Bill Homeier (24 laps). They shared the 2 points for fifth place.
 While in the lead, Bill Vukovich hit the 3-car pileup of Al Keller, Johnny Boyd, and Rodger Ward. He was killed (by fracture to the skull) when his car became airborne and went out of the course on the back long straightaway, landing upside down and on fire. His death concluded a streak of three straight years leading the most laps in the race (likely to have been four straight, 1955 inclusive), a feat unequaled since.
 Formula 1 championship debut for Keith Andrews, Johnny Boyd, Ray Crawford, Al Herman, Al Keller, Eddie Russo, Shorty Templeman and Chuck Weyant

Broadcasting

Radio
The race was carried live on the IMS Radio Network. Sid Collins served as chief announcer. The broadcast was carried by 237 affiliates in all 48 states, as well as Armed Forces Radio. The broadcast was dedicated to the memory of Wilbur Shaw, who was killed in a plane crash in October.

Luke Walton reported from the north pits for the third year. Charlie Brockman, in his fourth appearance on the network, conducted the winner's interview in victory lane.

All five of the major radio stations in the Indianapolis area carried the broadcast. The broadcast was notable as it reported the fatal crash of Bill Vukovich.

Championship standings after the race 

World Drivers' Championship standings

Note: Only the top five positions are included.

See also
 1955 AAA Championship Car season

References

External links
Indianapolis 500 History: Race & All-Time Stats – Official Site
1955 Indianapolis 500 Radio Broadcast, Indianapolis Motor Speedway Radio Network: Re-released by "Speedway Audio" – WIBC-AM (2004)
1955 Indianapolis 500 at RacingReference.info (Relief driver statistics)
1955 Indianapolis 500 Film - Oklahoma Historical Society Video and Film Archives

Indianapolis 500
Indianapolis 500
Indianapolis 500 races
Indianapolis 500
1955 in American motorsport